Elliott Oring (born 20 April 1945) is an American author of academic books primarily relating to the topics of folklore, humor, and cultural symbolism. Oring is Professor Emeritus of Anthropology at California State University, Los Angeles, and serves on the Editorial Board of Humor: International Journal of Humor Research. In 2010-2011 he was President of the International Society for Humor Studies.

Bibliography 
 Folk Groups And Folklore Genres: An Introduction
 Folk Groups And Folklore Genres Reader: A Reader  
 Engaging Humor
 Israeli Humor 
 The Jokes of Sigmund Freud: A Study in Humor and Jewish Identity  
 Israeli Humor: The Content and Structure of the Chizbat of the Palmah  
 The First Book of Jewish Jokes: The Collection of L. M. Büschenthal 
 Just Folklore: Analysis, Interpretation, Critique  
 Jokes and Their Relations
 Joking asides : the theory, analysis, and aesthetics of humor 
 Humor and the individual

References 

American folklorists
1945 births
Living people
California State University, Los Angeles alumni
Humor researchers
People associated with The Institute for Cultural Research